Abraham Kerns Arnold (March 24, 1837 – November 3, 1901) was a U.S. Cavalry officer during the American Civil War and, while a captain in the 5th U.S. Cavalry, received the Medal of Honor for leading "a gallant charge against a superior force of the enemy, extricated his command from a perilous position in which it had been ordered" against Confederate forces at Davenport Bridge, Virginia, on May 10, 1864.

He is the father of Colonel Percy Weir Arnold, a cavalry officer serving during the Spanish–American War, the Philippine–American War and the First World War.

Early life and education
Born in Bedford, Pennsylvania, Arnold entered West Point and graduated with the class of 1859 as a brevet Second Lieutenant in the 2nd Cavalry Regiment.

Career 
Participating in campaigns against the Comanche while stationed in Fort Inge, Arnold held a distinguished service record during the American Civil War. Promoted to first lieutenant in April 1861, he served as adjutant of the 5th Cavalry Regiment. He was cited "for gallant and meritorious services" at Gaines' Mill and Todds Tavern, brevetted to captain and major after both engagements respectively. He was awarded the Medal of Honor for his actions during the Battle of Davenport Bridge leading his regiment in a cavalry charge against superior Confederate forces to rescue men under his command and preventing their capture.

In June 1869, he was promoted to full major of the 6th U.S. Cavalry. By early 1879, he was directing operations against the Apaches in southeastern Arizona, accompanying an expedition into Mexico later that year in pursuit of renegade Apaches to Lake Guzman. As acting assistant adjutant general to General Orlando B. Willcox, Arnold would also take part in the Battle of Cibecue Creek on August 30, 1881. As a lieutenant colonel in 1886, he would also fight in the expedition against the Crows of the North Plains the following year. He would hold a number of command posts during the next twelve years, including a term as commander of the Cavalry and Light Artillery School (1895-1898), and was promoted to colonel in 1891.

During the Spanish–American War, he accepted a field commission as brigadier general of volunteers and led 2nd U.S. Division of the 7th Army Corps in Cuba from January 16, 1898, until April 1, 1899.

General Arnold was a Companion of the California Commandery of the Military Order of the Loyal Legion of the United States.

Death and legacy 
He retired on March 25, 1901, and died several months later in Cold Spring-On-Hudson, New York, on November 3, 1901.  His grave can be found in the Cemetery of Saint Philip's Church Garrison, New York.

Bibliography
 Notes on Horses for Cavalry Service (1869)
 A System of Exercises and Gymnastics for Use in School of Soldier Mounted (1887)
 The Cavalry at Gaines' Mill (1889)
 Special Report on Combined Manoeuvers at the Cavalry and Light Artillery (1896)

See also

 List of Medal of Honor recipients
 List of American Civil War Medal of Honor recipients: A–F

References

 Appletons' Annual Cyclopædia and Register of Important Events of the Year, 1902. New York: D. Appleton & Co., 1902.
 The Encyclopedia Americana: A Library of Universal Knowledge. Albany: J.B. Lyon Company, 1918.
 Gilman, Daniel Coit; Harry Thurston Peck and Frank Moore Colby, ed. The New International Encyclopædia, Vol. II. New York: Dodd, Mead & Co., 1902.
 Thomas, Joseph. Universal Pronouncing Dictionary of Biography and Mythology, Vol. I – AA to HER. Philadelphia: J.P. Lippencott Company, 1908.
 Thrapp, Dan L. Encyclopedia of Frontier Biography: In Three Volumes, Volume I (A–F). Lincoln: University of Nebraska Press, 1988.

Further reading
 Price, George F. Across the Continent with the Fifth Cavalry. New York: D. Van Nostrand, 1883.

External links
 

1837 births
1901 deaths
People from Bedford, Pennsylvania
American military personnel of the Spanish–American War
American people of the Indian Wars
United States Army Medal of Honor recipients
People of Pennsylvania in the American Civil War
Union Army officers
United States Army generals
American Civil War recipients of the Medal of Honor
United States Military Academy alumni